The Last Romance is a 2010 Philippine television drama romance series broadcast by GMA Network. The first installment of Love Bug, it stars Dennis Trillo and Carla Abellana. It premiered on May 23, 2010. The series concluded on June 13, 2010.

Cast and characters

 Dennis Trillo as Hero
 Carla Abellana as Rackie
 Iwa Moto as Remy
 Mike Tan as Dado
 Pinky Amador as Greta
 Paolo Paraiso as Phil
 Dang Cruz as Rosa Mia
 Pinky Marquez as Anita
 Renz Valerio as Joshua
 Rey "PJ" Abellana as Abel

References

2010 Philippine television series debuts
2010 Philippine television series endings
Filipino-language television shows
GMA Network drama series